Calisto raburni is a butterfly of the family Nymphalidae. It is endemic to Hispaniola.

References

Butterflies described in 1985
Calisto (butterfly)